Xinjiekou station is a station on Line 4 of the Beijing Subway.

Station Layout 
The station has an underground island platform.

Exits 
There are 4 exits, lettered A, B, C, and D. Exit B is accessible.

References

External links
 

Railway stations in China opened in 2009
Beijing Subway stations in Xicheng District